József Garami (born 9 August 1939) is a Hungarian football manager and former player, who is the manager of MTK Budapest.

Managerial career

Hungary
On 9 September 1987, Garami coached the Hungary national team in a 2–0 loss against Scotland in Glasgow. He led the team for four more matches including two victories over Greece and Cyprus in the Euro 1988 qualifiers.

MTK Budapest
Garami won the 1996–97 Nemzeti Bajnokság I with MTK Budapest. He repeated his success with the MTK Budapest by winning 2007-08 season.

References

1939 births
Living people
Sportspeople from Pécs
Hungarian footballers
Association football forwards
Hungarian football managers
Nemzeti Bajnokság I managers
Ferencvárosi TC managers
Újpest FC managers
MTK Budapest FC managers
Győri ETO FC managers
Komlói Bányász SK footballers
Pécsi VSK footballers
Hungary national football team managers
Pécsi MFC managers